Lapygino is a rural locality (a selo) and the administrative center of Lapyginsky Selsoviet, Starooskolsky District, Belgorod Oblast, Russia. The population was 872 as of 2010. There are 48 streets.

Geography 
Lapygino is located 13 km northeast of Stary Oskol (the district's administrative centre) by road. Kurskoye is the nearest rural locality.

References 

Rural localities in Starooskolsky District